Lorraine Senye is a South African politician from the Northern Cape. She is a Member of the Northern Cape Provincial Legislature. She was previously Mayor of the Siyancuma Local Municipality. Senye is a member of the African National Congress (ANC).

References

External links
Lorraine Senye – People's Assembly
Profile : Ms Lorraine Senye

Living people
African National Congress politicians
Members of the Northern Cape Provincial Legislature
Year of birth missing (living people)